is a railway station in the city of Mutsu, Aomori Prefecture, Japan, operated by East Japan Railway Company (JR East).

Lines
Chikagawa Station is served by the Ōminato Line, and is located 43.7 kilometers from the terminus of the line at Noheji Station.

Station layout
Although originally built with two opposed side platforms, at present Chikagawa Station has a single side platform serving bidirectional traffic. The station is unattended.

History
Chikagawa Station was opened on September 25, 1921. All freight services were discontinued from March 15, 1972, at which time the station became unmanned. With the privatization of Japanese National Railways (JNR) on April 1, 1987, the station came under the operational control of JR East.

Surrounding area

JMSDF Communications Command Ominato Chikagawa Receiving Station

See also
 List of railway stations in Japan

External links

  

Railway stations in Aomori Prefecture
Ōminato Line
Railway stations in Japan opened in 1921
Mutsu, Aomori